As Suwayriqiyah is a village in Al Madinah Province, in western Saudi Arabia. The village lies to the northeast of Al Jissah.

See also 

 List of cities and towns in Saudi Arabia
 Regions of Saudi Arabia

References

Populated places in Medina Province (Saudi Arabia)